The National Culture Fund of Bulgaria is the official arts council for Bulgaria.

National Culture Fund is the Bulgarian organization, which supports on national level the creation, development and distribution of Bulgarian culture and arts in the country and abroad.

External links
 National Culture Fund of Bulgaria http://www.ncf.bg/
 IFACCA (International Federation of Arts Councils and Culture Agencies) report on the National Culture Fund of Bulgaria https://web.archive.org/web/20060322102823/http://www.ifacca.org/ifacca2/en/profile/default.asp?id=88

Bulgarian art
Arts councils
Arts organizations based in Bulgaria